Fumbally Lane is a narrow and historic street in Dublin, Ireland, south of the city centre in The Liberties, 'In name and character perhaps the most evocative of all the Liberties' streets.' It connects Blackpitts to New Street and is close to St Patrick’s Cathedral.

History

This area was originally part of the Liberty of Thomas Court and Donore (later called the Earl of Meath's Liberty), having been granted by Henry VIII to Sir William Brabazon, whose ancestors were later the Earls of Meath, after the dissolution of the monasteries in 1538.

This location was then on the fringes of the expanding 18th-century city when the lane itself was set out by local brewer and Quaker Jacob Poole in 1721 to connect Blackpitts (where he had property) to New Street. The lane has long had mixed industrial and residential use. Historically, tanning brewing and associated industries flourished in this part of Dublin, partly because the River Poddle is close by. The industrial heritage of the area even dates back even to the mid 17th century and is linked to and influenced by both Quakers and Huguenots. In 2006 archaeologists found evidence of medieval leather tanning off Fumbally Lane and nearby New Street with wood-lined soaking pits and elaborate ditch systems. They also identified that one of the existing large old former brewery buildings on Fumbally dates from the 1740s.

Particularly brewing flourished here in the Fumbally/Blackpitts area since the mid 18th century. It is very possible that the first Dublin porter was brewed here. The Poole and Taylor families, who were related, had brewing interests here from at least that time and before.

From 1779 Samuel Madder operated the Blackpitts Porter Company on the north of the lane, he acquired a brewery from a James Farrell. In 1830 John Busby a distiller, acquired a brewery property in Fumbally and erected a new distillery here. This stone faced building features his initials JB and 1836 on a ’cast iron water tank’. This inscription can still be seen today. This particular refurbished 19th century stone faced building is part of the Fumbally Studio development and now home to both apartments and an office building.

In 1862 John Busby listed as 'a licensed distiller and maltster' was still operating in Fumbally but shortly afterwards sold out.

The City of Dublin Brewery was situated on the corner of Fumbally and Backpitts and between 1867 and 1883 they took over the 'Busby' buildings including a still house spirit store and a brewhouse. Later the complex was used for other industrial uses including use as a textile factory in the late 19th century, many of the buildings on the brewing complex and along the lane later fell into disuse or dereliction. 
A significant detached three storey house possibly dating from the 1720s existed in the street until the late 1980s. According to an unpublished thesis, this rare example of an early Irish house may have been built by the relations of Jacob Poole, a Quaker Taylor family, who had brewing interests here and in Marrowbone Lane. It may have incorporated offices for the brewery owner, as a deed from 1789 connects it to the brewery. This house was later used as a textile factory, housed 'Blair's Fancy Linens' and was subsequently burnt down and demolished circa 1990. Now only the large curved entrance walls and a cobble forecourt remain.

According to the 1901 Census just 68 people are listed as living on Fumbally Lane and 102 are listed in the 1911 census.

Origin of name

The name Fumbally is a peculiar one and a name that has provoked a wide range of theories and suggestions as to its origin. The street is officially called Fumbally Lane today or Lána Fumbally. It has not always been called that and has had many name variations since 1721.

The lane first appears in Charles Brooking's map of 1728 without a name and with variations in subsequent maps including John Rocque's map of 1756 as 'Bumbailiff’s Lane' and in Wilson's map of 1798 as 'Fumbailie’s Lane'. It is mistakenly suggested by the Rev. Mr. McCready in Dublin Street Names: Dated and Explained that Fumbally’s Lane (as it was then referred to in Thom's Directory) was just a ‘corruption of Bumbailiff's-lane’. Fumbally's Lane is also the name James Joyce uses in chapter 3 of his novel Ulysses where he refers to "the tanyard smells" "Bumbailiff" is a derogatory term for "a bailiff or underbailiff employed in serving writs, making arrests."

However, there is some evidence that the name derives from a local Huguenot family named Fontvielle, Fomboilie, Fombily, Fombela, Fonveille and or Fombally. The name appears differently in a wide variety of sources. Christine Casey refers to the street association with a Huguenot family called Fombily and confirming this, Peter Pearson provides two names: David Fombily and Anthony Fombily who were described as ‘skinners’. Pearson, in reference to a study on the houses the Liberties by Peter Walsh, confirms this from a 1741 lease given on two houses on 'Fombily's Lane'. There is further evidence from a Registry of Deeds entry of an assignment dated 7 October 1762, mentioned in the RSAI Journal in 1893  and from a reference to the RDS, written in 1915, referring to a Royal Dublin Society prize for life drawing in March 1746 was won by a 'Mr. Fombally'. These all suggest that a Fombally or Fombely family resided in Dublin and were associated with this lane in the mid-18th century. A 1788 Domestic Intelligence report in The Gentleman's Magazine mentions an assault on the corner of "Fombally's Lane."

In addition, records retrieved from the International Genealogical Index show that Charles, David, Ester, Jacques, Jean, Jeanne, Phillippe and Susanne Fonvielle were all born in Dublin or christened at Peter St. Church and dwelling at Lucy Lane (now Chancery Place, Smithfield) at the beginning of the 18th century in the period between 1704 and 1718.

Today

Substantial physical evidence of the 18th and 19th century brewing and distilling industry buildings remain on both sides of the lane today, including storehouses and a five-storey malthouse. Most of these remnants of its industrial past have been converted to modern office use.

Today, Fumbally Lane is home to dozens of people living in new apartments and in mainly 19th-century houses, although three possibly date to the late 18th century. It is also home to clusters of mainly design creative businesses based in Fumbally Court which is a large 19th-century distillery building, remodelled as offices c 1990 and Fumbally Square, a development of new office space developed in 2005. The street remains a ’unique remnant of the mixed residential  and industrial architecture that characterized the area’.

A number of local enterprises have borrowed the Fumbally name including the Fumbally Café and Fumbally Exchange, a non-profit community of design professionals founded in Fumbally Square in 2010.

References

Streets in Dublin (city)
History of Dublin (city)